Nowzad or Nawzad or Nauzad or Nozad (Persian/Afghani: نوزاد) is a Persian and Afghani word meaning "newborn." It is also a city name and surname.

Notable places, organizations and surnames include:

Organisations
 Nowzad Dogs, an Anglo-Afghani pet rescue charity

Places

Afghanistan
 Nawzad, Afghanistan, a small town in Helmand Province
 Nawzad District, a district in northern Helmand

Iran
 Nowzad, Kerman
 Nowzad, Razavi Khorasan
 Nowzad, Kashmar, Razavi Khorasan Province
 Nowzad, Darmian, South Khorasan Province
 Nowzad, Sarbisheh, South Khorasan Province
 Nawzad, Divan

Surnames 
 Haider Nawzad (born 1983): an Iraqi rower
 Pejman Nozad : an Iranian-American venture capitalist

Surnames of Afghan origin
Surnames of Iranian origin